Galkun (also Romanized as Galkūn; also known as Deh Gerdū, Galgūn, Galugan, and Golgān) is a village in Bakesh-e Yek Rural District, in the Central District of Mamasani County, Fars Province, Iran. At the 2006 census, its population was 799, in 153 families.

References 

Populated places in Mamasani County